The 2003 AFL Grand final was an Australian rules football game contested between the Brisbane Lions and the Collingwood Football Club, held at the Melbourne Cricket Ground in Melbourne on 27 September 2003. It was the 107th annual grand final of the Australian Football League (formerly the Victorian Football League), staged to determine the premiers for the 2003 AFL season.  The match, attended by 79,451 spectators, was won by Brisbane by a margin of 50 points, marking the club's third premiership victory, all won consecutively from 2001 to 2003.

Background
Brisbane had appeared in the AFL Grand Final for the past two years, winning both contests. Collingwood had competed against Brisbane in the previous year's grand final, losing by 9 points.

At the conclusion of the home and away season, Port Adelaide had finished first on the AFL ladder with 18 wins and 4 losses, winning their second successive McClelland Trophy. Collingwood finished second with 15 wins and 7 losses, and Brisbane was third with 14 wins, 7 losses and a draw. The two sides faced each other in a low-scoring qualifying final won by Collingwood, 9.12 (66) d. 7.9 (51).

In the week prior to the grand final, Collingwood forward Anthony Rocca was suspended during the week for an elbow to the head of Port Adelaide's Brendon Lade player during the preliminary final; Rocca had played every game of the year and kicked 45 goals, and had also been one of Collingwood's best in the previous year's grand final, and his suspension was considered a major blow to the Magpies' chances; Tristen Walker took Rocca's place in the team. Brisbane's had numerous key players under injury clouds, including captain Michael Voss with an injured knee, Nigel Lappin with broken ribs and both Alastair Lynch and Martin Pike with hamstring injuries, but all four ended up playing.

The build-up was further magnified due to the Lions' chance of being the first team since Melbourne in the 1950s to win three successive premierships. Attention was also focussed on whether the Magpies would avenge their close loss to the Lions in the previous year's grand final. In the week leading up to the grand final, Collingwood's Nathan Buckley was awarded the Brownlow Medal, which was tied among Buckley, Sydney's Adam Goodes and Adelaide's Mark Ricciuto.

The match attendance of 79,451 spectators was the smallest grand Final attendance at the MCG since the 1946 VFL Grand Final, owing to a part of the grandstands having been demolished to make way for the construction of new seating at the ground for the 2006 Commonwealth Games.

Match summary

First quarter

The Lions dominated the Magpies and led throughout the majority of the match, gaining the lead inside the first two minutes and never relinquishing it. The Lions led 5.5 (35) to Collingwood's 3.3 (21) at quarter time.

Second quarter

Two early Brisbane goals extended the margin to 25 points five minutes into the second quarter; and while Alan Didak was able to peg one back for Collingwood in the 9th minute, a flurry of four goals to Brisbane in the latter part of the quarter opened a game-winning 42 points half time lead, from which Collingwood never seriously challenged.

Third quarter

Collingwood won the third quarter, kicking two early goals to bring the margin back to 30 points, but overall after kicking 5.0 (30) to Brisbane's 3.5 (23) for the quarter, the difference was still a nearly insurmountable 35 points at three-quarter time.

Fourth quarter

Collingwood attacked hard to open the final quarter, but after four behinds, Brisbane ran away with the game, kicking five goals between the 15th and 26 minutes of the quarter to open a game-high 69-point lead. Three late goals to Collingwood narrowed the final margin to fifty points, Brisbane 20.14 (134) d. Collingwood 12.12 (84).

Norm Smith Medal

Simon Black of the Lions was awarded the Norm Smith Medal for being judged the best player afield. His 39 disposals set and, as of 2021, still holds the record for equal most disposals by a player in a grand final sharing that record with Christian Petracca. Jason Akermanis kicked five goals for Brisbane.

Post match

With this win, Brisbane became AFL premiers for the third consecutive year, the fifth team in VFL/AFL history to do so and first since 1955–57, earning a place among the greatest teams of the modern era. Brisbane would go on to contest a fourth consecutive grand final in the 2004 AFL Grand Final, but would lose that game to Port Adelaide.

Teams

Scorecard

See also 
 2003 AFL season

Notes

References

VFL/AFL Grand Finals
Afl Grand Final, 2003
Brisbane Lions
Collingwood Football Club